Coleophora straminella is a moth of the family Coleophoridae that is endemic to Libya.

References

External links

straminella
Moths of Africa
Moths described in 1934